Cu2+-exporting ATPase is an enzyme with systematic name ATP phosphohydrolase (Cu2+-exporting). This enzyme catalyses the following chemical reaction

 ATP + H2O + Cu2+in  ADP + phosphate + Cu2+out

This P-type ATPase undergoes covalent phosphorylation during the transport cycle.

See also 
 ATP7A

References

External links 
 

EC 3.6.3